is a Japanese artistic gymnast. She is an uneven bars specialist, and placed 4th in that event at both the 2005 World Artistic Gymnastics Championships and 2006 World Artistic Gymnastics Championships.

She was named to the 2008 Japanese Olympic Team and placed 5th in the team competition.

External links
 
 

1989 births
Living people
Japanese female artistic gymnasts
Olympic gymnasts of Japan
Gymnasts at the 2008 Summer Olympics
Asian Games medalists in gymnastics
Gymnasts at the 2006 Asian Games
Sportspeople from Aichi Prefecture
Asian Games silver medalists for Japan
Medalists at the 2006 Asian Games
20th-century Japanese women
21st-century Japanese women